Niermann is a German surname. Notable people with the surname include:

Georg Niermann (born 1937), West German rower
Grischa Niermann (born 1975), German road bicycle racer
Ingo Niermann (born 1969), German novelist, writer, and artist

See also
Niemann

German-language surnames